The Registration of Criminals and Undesirable Persons Act 1969, is a Malaysian laws which enacted to consolidate and amend the law providing for the registration of certain criminals, banishees, expelees, deportees and restrictees and for other purposes connected with it.

Structure
The Registration of Criminals and Undesirable Persons Act 1969, in its current form (1 January 2006), consists of 16 sections and 3 schedules (including 11 amendments), without separate Part.
Section 1: Short title and application
Section 2: Interpretation
Section 3: Appointment of officers
Section 4: Minister may deem or declare other particulars to be registrable particulars
Section 5: Functions of recording officer
Section 6: Functions of authenticating officer
Section 7: Register of registrable particulars to be kept
Section 8: Refusal to sign fingerprint form an offence
Section 9: Return of fingerprint form on acquittal, etc.
Section 10: Proof of finger impressions and previous convictions
Section 11: Proof of previous convictions outside the Federation
Section 12: Inspector General may exempt certain cases from provision of Act
Section 13: Minister may order destruction of particulars of banishee, etc.
Section 14: Regulations
Section 15: Schedules and forms
Section 16: Repeal and transitional
Schedules

References

External links
 Registration of Criminals and Undesirable Persons Act 1969 

1969 in Malaysian law
Malaysian federal legislation